State elections in 2023 will be held in Selangor, Kelantan, Terengganu, Negeri Sembilan, Kedah and Penang as their terms expire this year.

Important Dates

Selangor

Kelantan

Terengganu

Negeri Sembilan

Kedah

Penang

References

2023 elections in Malaysia
2023